Fenian Street is a street in Dublin, Ireland.

Location
Fenian Street runs from Lincoln Place at the western end, to Hogan Place at the eastern end, parallel with Pearse Street.

History
Fenian Street was formally called Denzille or Denzil Street, first appearing on maps around 1770. It was named after the son of John Holles, Denzille Holles. It was renamed Fenian Street, after the Fenian Brotherhood, who operated from the street in the 1850s.

On 12 June 1963, 2a, 3, and 4 Fenian Street tenement houses collapsed. This resulted in the deaths of two young girls, Linda Byrne (aged 8) and Marion Vardy (aged 9), who were passing the building when it collapsed. The collapse was blamed on the fast drying out of water saturated bricks after a period of heavy rain, and prompted demands for poorly maintained and dangerous tenement buildings to be demolished. In the 18 months after the collapse on Fenian Street, over 1200 Georgian houses in Dublin were demolished.

Architecture
No. 25 Fenian Street is one of the oldest buildings in the area, predating the layout of nearby Merrion Square. Dating from the 17th century, the street would have been a coastal road at the time of construction, with the house facing the coastline and bay. The current building was first built in 1729 with a high pitched roof which was later amended to a more Palladian style. The building was subject to emergency remedial works in 2015.

Archer's Garage is a notable building on the corner of Fenian Street and Sandwith Street.

See also
List of streets and squares in Dublin

References

External links
News report on unsafe tenement buildings from RTÉ News 1 October 1971

Streets in Dublin (city)